Rowena Dolores Heath (born August 3, 1926), also known as Dodie Heath, credited as Dody Heath, is an American retired actress of stage, film, and television.

Early life
She was born Rowena Dolores Heath in Seattle, Washington to Wilfrid Paul Heath and Alice (Alexander) Heath. She had one sibling, an older brother. Her father was an inventor, who patented processes for using carbonization in the production of ice cream and butter. When Rowena was only six months old, her father sent a testimonial letter and photo of the infant to a goat milk company, praising the product she had been fed on since birth. The company printed both the photo and letter in a Chicago-area newspaper advertisement, preserving the details of Heath's birth and foreshadowing her life in the public eye.

Although his patents brought him a substantial income in the 1920s, Heath's father proved a poor investor and was reduced to designing homemade games and toys for local kids in the 1930s. By this time his daughter's first name had been dropped in favor of her middle name. The family relocated to Richmond Beach, Shoreline, Washington by 1940, their fortunes recovering as Heath's father turned to selling electronics, enabling him to provide Heath with a university education.

After graduating from the University of Washington School of Drama, Heath moved to Manhattan in July 1949, where she lived at the Rehearsal Club. This social club provided safe and inexpensive accommodations for some fifty aspiring actresses at a time. Heath lived here, helped by a $75 a month subsidy from her parents, until her second Broadway stage job enabled her to get her own apartment.

Broadway stage  
Heath first appeared on the Broadway stage as a replacement in the role of "Ensign Sue Yeager" for South Pacific during late 1950. She left in February 1951 when signed for a new musical A Tree Grows in Brooklyn., which was based more on the 1945 screen adaption than the original novel. The new show did a two week tryout in Philadelphia, then moved to Broadway. As a member of the original cast Heath was with the show for its tryout and the entire opening run from April thru December 1951. Her character "Hildy", created for the musical, was only briefly in the first act of the play.  

Her next stage role was as understudy for star Janet Blair in a short-lived comedy by F. Hugh Herbert called A Girl Can Tell. The show ran for only sixty performances on Broadway, from October thru December 1953. Heath, however, left half way thru the run when she caught the eye of director Vincente Minelli, who signed her for his next MGM film, Brigadoon. 

Heath was cast as forward Scottish lass "Meg Brockie", which in the stage production was a secondary lead with two songs. MGM's budget reduced the part to a couple of comic scenes with Van Johnson's character "Jeff". Whether or not Minnelli was personally interested in Heath as gossip columnists reported, he did give her a memorable film debut.

Following production of Brigadoon, Heath returned to the Broadway stage in Oh, Men! Oh, Women!. She replaced the original female lead Barbara Baxley as "Mildred Turner" during July 1954, and continued in the role until the show closed in November 1954.

Film and television
Heath did her first television acting role in January 1953, on an episode of the New York based CBS mystery series The Web. Television would become Heath's mainstay from 1959 thru 1962, as she made guest star appearances in twelve different series. Aside from one brief engagement during September 1961, she never returned to the stage. The Diary of Anne Frank (in which Heath played Miep Gies) began filming in March 1958. Newspapers reported in summer 1958 that she had given up her New York apartment and would concentrate on a film career going forward. She started work on her third film, Ask Any Girl, during September 1958.

After her first marriage in late 1962, Heath seemed to forgo television as well. She dropped out of professional casting directories after 1963, but continued to do films. Late 1963 saw her in Yugoslavia, making a German crime drama called Dog Eat Dog, aka When Strangers Meet. It wasn't released in the US until 1966, by which time she had two other films, Seconds and The Fortune Cookie on the big screen. Her role in the former was minor, while she was nearly invisible as a nun in the latter. Her last performance in any medium came eight years later in 1974, when she did a minor role in a strange horror film called Welcome to Arrow Beach. It played only in the southeastern US and quickly disappeared from theaters.

Personal life
From 1954 to 1959, Heath was linked in gossip columns with circus owner John Ringling North, who was twenty five years older. A public engagement announcement was put out in May 1955 by her parents, which some sources have mistaken for a wedding notice. However, by August 1955 it was reported that Heath did not want to marry him and give up her career. North wrote a song for her called Dody which was published in summer 1956 by Frank Loesser's Frank Music Company and licensed under ASCAP. The couple had an on-again/off-again relationship and never did marry.

Heath married agent turned producer Jack Cushingham (1919-1985) in Rome, Italy in November 1962. They lived in the Bel Air neighborhood of Los Angeles and remained married until his death in 1985. Following his death, Heath married British producer Richard M. Soames.

Spelling variants
"Dody" and "Dodie" are both diminutives of Dolores. For all but two of her stage, film, and television performing credits, this article's subject was billed as "Dody Heath". This was also the name under which she was listed in professional casting directories. It was the name she used for international travel, as shown on passenger lists. The variant spelling "Dodie" can be traced back to syndicated newspaper columnist George Hamilton Combs Jr in March 1951.

Stage performances

Filmography

References

External links 
 

1926 births
Living people
American film actresses
American stage actresses
American television actresses
Possibly living people
Actresses from Seattle